Bulingugwe Island is a small island in northern Lake Victoria. It is about 6 miles (10 km) south of Kampala, Uganda. 

After the Battle of Mengo Hill (24 January 1892), the Kabaka (King) Mwanga II of Buganda fled to exile there briefly.

References

Islands of Lake Victoria
Lake islands of Uganda